Charles Finn may refer to:
 Charles Finn (water polo), American water polo player
 Charles C. Finn, American poet
 Charles A. Finn, priest of the Archdiocese of Boston
 Charlie Finn, American actor

See also
 Chuck Finn, an Australian children's fantasy television series